Allan Dellon Santos Dantas (born 16 February 1979), or simply Allan Dellon, is a Brazilian striker.

Career
Born in Vila Velha, Allan Dellon began his playing career with Vitória. He made his Campeonato Brasileiro Série A debut for the club in 1998, and would score 14 goals in the 2000 Brasileiro and 11 goals in the 2001 Brasileiro.

Honours
Nordeste Cup: 1997, 1999
Bahia State League: 2000, 2002

Contract
1 January 2006 to 20 December 2007

References

External links 

1979 births
Living people
Brazilian footballers
Brazilian expatriate footballers
Campeonato Brasileiro Série A players
Liga MX players
Esporte Clube Vitória players
Querétaro F.C. footballers
CR Vasco da Gama players
Sport Club do Recife players
Brasiliense Futebol Clube players
Expatriate footballers in Mexico
Association football forwards